The Plague (also known as Clive Barker's The Plague) is a 2006 horror film directed by Hal Masonberg and written by Masonberg and Teal Minton.  It was produced by Clive Barker.

Plot
In 1983, one day all of the world's children under the age of nine simultaneously fall into a catatonic state. For the next ten years, every child who is born, is born in a state of catatonia. During this state, the children experience seizures twice a day which develops and maintains muscle mass.

In 1993, all the children wake up in zombie-like state, unrelentingly pursuing, attacking and murdering all adults. Things are revealed to be even more dire as the children have both superhuman strength and some kind of collective intelligence - what one learns, they all learn.

The children's tactics quickly become more sophisticated. First, they disable the engines in almost every car and then set up roadblocks to stop the adults from escaping. Then, they learn how to use firearms. The children also take the souls of the ones they kill as a part of deliverance. The adults must find a way to stop them before it's too late.

Cast
 James Van Der Beek as Tom Russel
 Ivana Miličević as Jean Raynor
 Brad Hunt as Sam Raynor
 Joshua Close as Kip
 Brittany Scobie as Claire
 Bradley Sawatzky as Nathan Burgandy
 John P. Connolly as Sheriff Cal Stewart
 Dee Wallace as Nora
 John Ted Wynne as Dr. Jenkins
 Arne McPherson as David

Release
The Region 1 DVD was released September 5, 2006. The Plague: Writer's & Director's Cut, exists but has, to date, has remained unreleased.

Reception
Bloody Disgusting rated it 3/5 stars and wrote, "But even as the premise of The Plague continues to titillate and intrigue, the film can’t quite deliver on its promise, rendering it slightly entertaining and ultimately forgettable."  Steve Barton of Dread Central rated it 2/5 stars and wrote, "Clive Barker may have in some way produced this mess and lent his name to it, but rest assured there’s nothing Barker-esque about it. All that's here is a giant missed opportunity which — pardon the really bad, yet fitting pun — you should avoid like the plague."  Scott Weinberg of DVD Talk rated it 2.5/5 stars and wrote that it does not live up the premise, instead "devolving into yet another (and very stale) zombie-type chase thriller".  David Johnson of DVD Verdict wrote, "The Plague is an inscrutable movie that starts out strong, but loses forward momentum, eventually grinding to an awkward halt."

See also 
 Village of the Damned (1960 film) (similar plot)

References

External links
 
 
 
 

2006 films
2006 horror films
American science fiction horror films
Films set in 1983
Films set in 1993
Films set in New Hampshire
2000s English-language films
2000s American films
Sony Pictures direct-to-video films